Gara Bridge railway station was a station on the Kingsbridge branch of the GWR.

History
The station opened on the 19 December 1893 when the Great Western Railway(GWR) opened the Kingsbridge branch line. The line had been planned, and authorised in 1882, by the Kingsbridge and Salcombe Railway which was subsequently acquired by the GWR in 1888.

The stone built station was the only one on the line to have a passing loop.

The station was host to a GWR camp coach from 1934 to 1939. A camping coach was also positioned here by the Western Region in 1956 and 1957 then two coaches from 1958 to 1962.

The station closed on 16 September 1963.

Despite a great deal of local opposition station was closed for freight and passengers on 16 September 1963, and is now a private dwelling.

References

Bibliography

External links
Gara Bridge on Disused Stations
 Station on 1947 OS Map

Former Great Western Railway stations
Disused railway stations in Devon
Railway stations in Great Britain opened in 1893
Railway stations in Great Britain closed in 1963